This is a list of the current channels available on digital terrestrial television in Australia.

The commercial channels available to viewers depend on location and station ownership. The process of aggregation during the late 80s to mid 90s saw regional stations take on affiliations with metropolitan channels for programming, a practice that has continued into digital television with affiliated stations carrying various multichannels from their metropolitan counterparts.

Metropolitan in this list therefore refers to the capitals of Melbourne, Sydney, Brisbane, Adelaide and Perth, where stations are owned and operated by the network rather than affiliates.

In areas not covered by terrestrial transmissions, the digital channels are provided by the free-to-view VAST satellite platform. The television channels on this platform are all encoded in H.264 and subject to a MPEG-LA controlled transmission patent licensing tax which is included in the VAST broadcaster cost and varies on viewership figures. The terrestrial transmissions still use H.262, which doesn't incur any additional transmission costs, but select channels are broadcast terrestrially in H.264.

Government funded broadcasters

Australian Broadcasting Corporation

Special Broadcasting Service

Metropolitan commercial broadcasters

Seven West Media 

STQ Regional QLD services broadcast on 6x LCNs where signal overlap with BTQ Brisbane occurs.

Racing.com is a joint venture with Racing Victoria. Seven West Media also co-owns 10 affiliates WDT and MDV (joint ventures with WIN Corporation).  ishop TV is a joint venture with Brand Developers.

Nine Entertainment Co. 

9Rush is a joint venture with Warner Bros. Discovery. Nine Entertainment also co-owns Ten affiliate DTD (joint venture with Southern Cross Austereo) in Darwin.

Paramount Networks ANZ 

TVSN is owned by Direct Group.

Regional and remote area commercial broadcasters

WIN Corporation (Primary Nine affiliate) 

WIN Corporation also co-owns 10 affiliates MDV, WDT (joint ventures with Seven West Media), and TDT (joint venture with Southern Cross Austereo).

Imparja Television (Remote Nine affiliate) 

Imparja Television also co-owns 10 affiliate CDT (joint venture with Southern Cross Austereo).

Southern Cross Austereo (Primary 10 and remote Seven affiliates) 

Southern Cross Austereo also co-owns 10 affiliates TDT (joint venture with WIN Corporation), CDT and DTD (joint ventures with Imparja Television and Nine Entertainment Co. respectively).

Joint venture stations 

Mildura Digital Television and West Digital Television are co-owned by Seven West Media and Nine affiliate WIN Corporation.

Tasmanian Digital Television is co-owned by Seven affiliate Southern Cross Austereo and Nine affiliate WIN Corporation.

Central Digital Television is co-owned by Seven affiliate Southern Cross Austereo and Nine affiliate Imparja Television.

Darwin Digital Television is co-owned by Nine Entertainment Co. and Seven affiliate Southern Cross Austereo.

Local broadcasters

Open narrowcasting services

Community television

VAST satellite services 

ICTV is available via terrestrial television in Alice Springs and Broome, and via VAST in other areas.

Discontinued channels

Digital Forty Four 

The following channels were only available in Sydney as the Digital Forty Four suite of channels. The datacast trial began on 17 March 2004 and ended on 30 April 2010.

Community television 

The following channels were community-based broadcasters that were available on digital television in the metropolitan cities. Some remain available via online video on demand services.

Notes

See also

Australian and New Zealand television frequencies
Digital television in Australia
High-definition television in Australia
Internet television in Australia
Subscription television in Australia

References

Digital
Australian television-related lists
Australia, Channels